The Kirkhof College of Nursing is located at Grand Valley State University in Grand Rapids, Michigan, United States.

External links
 

Nursing schools in Michigan
Universities and colleges in Kent County, Michigan
Grand Valley State University
Educational institutions established in 1973
1973 establishments in Michigan